The China National Intellectual Property Administration (CNIPA), also known as the Chinese Patent Office, is the patent office of the People's Republic of China (PRC). It was founded in 1980 as the Patent Office of the People's Republic of China, before changing its name to "State Intellectual Property Office" (SIPO), then to "National Intellectual Property Administration", and then to "China National Intellectual Property Administration". It is responsible, in its own words, "for patent work and comprehensively coordination of the foreign related affairs in the field of intellectual property".

See also 
 Baidu Patents
 Intellectual property in the People's Republic of China
 First Sino-American Forum of Intellectual Property Rights

References

External links 
  
  
 English search functions on the Experimental Platform of Patent Information Services  (official search service on Chinese patents)
 Information about patent law in China on the European Patent Office web site

1980 establishments in China
Organizations established in 1980
Patent offices
People's Republic of China intellectual property law
Science and technology in China
State Council of the People's Republic of China
International Searching and Preliminary Examining Authorities